Buddingtonite is an ammonium feldspar with formula: NH4AlSi3O8 (note: some sources add 0.5H2O to the formula). It forms by hydrothermal alteration of primary feldspar minerals. It is an indicator of possible gold and silver deposits, as they can become concentrated by hydrothermal processes. It crystallizes in the monoclinic crystal system and is colorless to white with a vitreous luster. Its structure is analogous to that of high sanidine (KAlSi3O8). Buddingtonite has a hardness of 5.5 and a specific gravity of 2.32.

Buddingtonite was discovered in 1964 at the Sulfur Bank mine near Clear Lake in Lake County, California. Clear Lake is at the north end of The Geysers geothermal area. It also occurs in the Tonopah, Nevada area and in hydrothermal areas in New Zealand and Japan. It has also been reported from the sedimentary Phosphoria Formation in Idaho, South Dakota, Wyoming, and Montana. It occurs in the oil shale deposit, near Proserpine, Queensland, Australia.

It was named for Arthur Francis Buddington (1890–1980), a petrologist at Princeton University.

References

Other reading
 
 

Ammonium minerals
Aluminium minerals
Feldspar
Monoclinic minerals
Minerals in space group 12